Park Kang-Jo (born 24 January 1980) is a former Japanese-born South Korean footballer He played as midfielder and spent 10 years of his professional career with Japanese J1 League club Vissel Kobe until retirement and current head coach WE League club of INAC Kobe Leonessa.

On 28 May 2000, Park Kang-Jo made his A-Match debut in a friendly against FR Yugoslavia.

Club statistics

1Includes Emperor's Cup & Korean FA Cup.
2Includes J. League Cup & K-League Cup.

National team statistics

International goals
Results list South Korea's goal tally first.

References

External links

 
 National Team Player Record 
 

Living people
1980 births
Association football midfielders
Association football people from Hyōgo Prefecture
South Korean footballers
South Korean expatriate footballers
South Korea international footballers
Kyoto Sanga FC players
Seongnam FC players
Vissel Kobe players
J1 League players
J2 League players
K League 1 players
Expatriate footballers in Japan
South Korean expatriate sportspeople in Japan
Footballers at the 2000 Summer Olympics
Olympic footballers of South Korea
People from Amagasaki
Zainichi Korean people